This is a listing of lakes, reservoirs, and dams located in the State of Kansas.

Lakes and reservoirs by size

The shorelines of Kansas Lakes are mostly in government ownership and open to the public for hunting, fishing, camping, and hiking. Large areas of public land surround most of the lakes.

Sources: Army Corps of Engineers, Bureau of Reclamation, Kansas State Parks. Copan, Hulah, and Kaw lakes extend into Kansas but are mostly in Oklahoma.

Natural lakes
 Cheyenne Bottoms  of wetland and marsh in  lowland 
 Lake Inman
 Lake View Lake
 Quivira National Wildlife Refuge  of wetland and marsh in  refuge

Man-made lakes

Lakes managed by the U.S. Army Corps of Engineers
 Big Hill Lake
 Clinton Lake
 Council Grove Lake
 El Dorado Lake
 Elk City Lake
 Fall River Lake
 Hillsdale Lake
 John Redmond Reservoir
 Kanopolis Lake
 Marion Reservoir
 Melvern Lake
 Milford Lake
 Perry Lake
 Pomona Lake
 Toronto Lake
 Tuttle Creek Lake
 Wilson Lake
 Wabaunsee Lake

Reservoirs managed by the Bureau of Reclamation

 Cedar Bluff Reservoir
 Cheney Reservoir
 Keith Sebelius Lake
 Kirwin Reservoir
 Lovewell Reservoir
 Waconda Lake
 Webster Reservoir

Reservoirs managed by the Kansas Department of Wildlife and Parks
 Farlington Lake
 Jamestown Lake
 Neosho State Fishing Lake aka Lake McKinley

Reservoirs managed by other group 
 Lake Jivaro
 Lake Vaquero

Diversion dams
 Almena Diversion Dam
 Woodston Diversion Dam

References

Lake

Kansas
Kansas